= Georg Zoidl =

- Scientific career
- Fields: Neuroscience
- Institutions: York University

Georg Zoidl is an Austrian-Canadian Canada Research Chair for Molecular and Cellular Neuroscience at York University.
